Inwood Country Club is a private Golf, Tennis & Beach Club in Inwood, New York, located adjacent to Jamaica Bay and just southeast of John F. Kennedy International Airport.

Originally established as nine-hole course in 1901, it is one of the oldest golf courses on Long Island.  The course was expanded to an eighteen-hole layout  in 1906. Prior to hosting any major championships, the course was in part redesigned by course architect Herbert Strong. The front nine of the course features an unusual layout: three consecutive par 5s followed by two par 3s in a row.

In the early 1920s, Inwood hosted two major championships, won by two of the game's legends.  The PGA Championship in 1921 was won by Walter Hagen, the first of his five wins in that major, then a match play competition. Two years later, 21-year-old amateur Bobby Jones won the U.S. Open, the first of his four titles in that championship.

Inwood Country Club is the only country club in the metropolitan area to have its own private beach club, which is located a few minutes from its main house in the affluent beach town of Atlantic Beach, NY. The Creek Club on the north shore of Long Island also has its own private beach club.

1923 U.S. Open 

Jones had a three shot lead entering the final round, but his lead vanished when he ended bogey-bogey-double bogey. Leaving the 18th green, Jones remarked disgustedly, "I didn't finish like a champion ... I finished like a yellow dog." When Bobby Cruickshank made birdie on the last hole to tie, Jones found himself needing to win an 18-hole playoff to secure his first championship. The next day, Jones and Cruickshank played the first 17 holes all-square. Calmly executing what would prove to be one of the finest shots of his career, Jones drilled a two-iron to within eight feet of the pin.

Course Layout

References

External links

Golden Age U.S. Open Courses Improve With Age

Golf clubs and courses in New York (state)
Sports venues in Long Island
Sports venues in Nassau County, New York
Hempstead, New York
Five Towns